Ronald Lee Ridenhour (April 6, 1946 – May 10, 1998) was an American known for having played a central role in spurring the federal investigation of the 1968 Mỹ Lai massacre in Vietnam. When he first learned of events there, he was serving in the United States 11th Infantry Brigade in Vietnam. He gathered evidence and interviewed people before the end of his tour. After returning to the US in 1969, he wrote to President Nixon, members of his cabinet and two dozen Congressmen recounting what he had learned. A full-scale Department of Defense investigation eventually took place.

Ridenhour became an award-winning investigative journalist, working on a range of topics. The Ridenhour Prizes were established in his honor.

Life
Ridenhour was born in Oakland, California, and was raised in Phoenix, Arizona. He entered the US Army during the Vietnam War, serving as a helicopter gunner. 

While serving in Vietnam, Ridenhour heard of the Mỹ Lai massacre from friends in the service. While still on active duty, he gathered eyewitness and participant accounts from other soldiers. 

After his return to the United States in 1969, he wrote a letter detailing the evidence, which he sent to President Richard Nixon, five senior officials at the State Department and the Pentagon, and 24 members of Congress. 

The Department of Defense conducted a lengthy probe. Some twenty-six soldiers were charged with criminal offenses. Former Lieutenant William Calley, Jr. was the only one convicted, for killing 22 villagers.

Postwar life
Ridenhour went to college after his service and graduated in 1972 from Claremont Men's College. He became an investigative journalist, reporting on a range of government scandals and other issues.

Years later, Ridenhour published an account of learning about the My Lai massacre in his article, "Jesus Was a Gook," published in Nobody Gets Off the Bus: The Viet Nam Generation Big Book (1994).

He died at age 52 of a heart attack in 1998 in Metairie, Louisiana. He had been playing handball.

Honors
 In 1987 he won a George Polk Award for his expose of a tax scandal in New Orleans, based on a year-long investigation. 
 In 1988 he earned the Gerald Loeb Award for Commentary.
 The Ridenhour Prizes were established in his honor. They "recognize those who persevere in acts of truth-telling that protect the public interest, promote social justice or illuminate a more just vision of society".

(Note: According to Jonathan Glover's book, Humanity: A Moral History of the Twentieth Century (2001), Ridenhour took part in the Princeton University version of the Milgram experiment. This claim was investigated and it was found that the Ron Ridenhour who took part in the Milgram experiment was a different person than Ronald Lee Ridenhour.)

References

External links
 
 A first-person account of Ridenhour's investigation and exposure of the My Lai Massacre, transcribed from a talk he gave at Tulane University in 1994
 Ronald Ridenhour essay, "Jesus Was a Gook"

United States Army personnel of the Vietnam War
Mỹ Lai massacre
Writers from Oakland, California
Military personnel from Phoenix, Arizona
Military personnel from California
1946 births
1998 deaths
American whistleblowers
United States Army soldiers
Claremont McKenna College alumni
American investigative journalists
George Polk Award recipients
20th-century American writers
Gerald Loeb Award winners for Columns, Commentary, and Editorials